Henry Brouncker may refer to:

Henry Brouncker (died 1607) (1550–1607), English MP
 Henry Brouncker, 3rd Viscount Brouncker (c. 1627–1688), Restoration-era courtier